John Lee (8 November 1890–1955) was an English footballer who played in the Football League for Chelsea, Hull City, Rotherham United and Watford.

References

1890 births
1955 deaths
English footballers
Association football forwards
English Football League players
Hull City A.F.C. players
Chelsea F.C. players
Watford F.C. players
Rotherham United F.C. players